Peter Byrne may refer to:

 Peter Byrne (actor) (1928–2018), English actor and director
 Peter Byrne (basketball) (born 1948), Australian Olympic basketball player
 Peter Byrne (philosopher), author and lecturer on philosophy
 Peter Byrne (politician) (1892–1974), member of the Queensland Legislative Assembly
 Peter Byrne (sailor) (1936–2017), Canadian Olympic sailor
 Peter Byrne (weather presenter), Australian television presenter and former meteorologist
 Peter John Byrne (born 1951), American prelate of the Catholic Church
 Pete Byrne (born 1954), British musician

See also
Peter Burns (disambiguation)